Westgarth Forster (1772, Coalcleugh – 1835, Garrigill) was a geologist and mining engineer. He was the son of a mining engineer (Westgarth Forster the elder, 1738–1797), and was born in Coalcleugh, Northumberland. He became a mining agent on Alston Moor, an area in the Pennines noted for its extensive lead mines, but died penniless in 1835.

Author
He is known principally as the author of a book called A Treatise on a Section of the Strata from Newcastle-upon-Tyne to the Mountain of Cross Fell in Cumberland. The first edition (1809) is very rare; his work is known mainly from the second edition (1821). A third edition was published in 1883, which was, however, much revised and modified by its editor, the Rev. W. Nall.

The work describes the local strata in the north-east in their vertical sequence as discovered during mining operations. It also discusses the ways of prospecting for ore and developing mineral veins, especially the method of hushing from dams built high on the hillsides. There are numerous remains of such dams in many British ore-fields, especially in the northern Pennines. The method survives in modern gold-fields in Africa.

He recognised cyclic sedimentation in Carboniferous rocks and produced detailed stratigraphic columns.

Pre-1809
Turner (1793) reported on a visit to Allenheads where the Westgarth Forsters, father and son, showed him "various plans and sections illustrative of the position and quality of the strata, the course of the veins, and the various mining operations." He wrote of Westgarth Forster junior as follows, "I cannot help here congratulating the Society upon the expectation they may reasonably form of much information and entertainment from the communications of this ingenious young man, for whose nomination as an honorary member, we are much obliged to the gentleman who proposed him." Turner (1793) apparently saw the draft form of Forster's "nearly finished" section "of the strata which comprises the mining country to the depth of 500 fathoms."

Wilkinson (1997) was able to fill in many details from the years before 1809, making extensive use of the Blackett Lead Company archives. He recorded that Westgarth Forster senior was officially employed at Coalcleugh on 10 June 1771 and that Westgarth Forster junior was born at Coalcleugh. In 1775 Westgarth Forster senior was installed at Allenheads, ready for the start of the July–September quarter, at a salary of £60 per annum.

Tribute
A tribute to Forster, penned by Nall, appeared in the third edition:
Though nearly half a century has elapsed since the grave closed over Westgarth Forster's remains, his name still continues a household word amongst the people of Alston Moor; he lives in their minds as a clever, though somewhat eccentric man, different in many respects from the ordinary run of men. But it is not only among the Alstonians that his name lives; it is frequently heard in Weardale and Allendale. Local mining agents and local geologists are familiar with it; mining agents and geologists, who have a mining reputation which is more than local, still continue to quote him as an authority on mining and geological questions. His "Section of the Strata" is still the standard work on the geology of the two northern counties. It was never more highly prized by miners than it is now. Though the book was written when the science of geology was in its initial stage; when even people of education recognised no distinction between one kind of rock and another; when such terms as stratified and unstratified, aqueous and igneous, seldom appeared in print, and were scarcely ever heard; when the great works of Buckland, De la Beche, Phillips, Lyell, Murchison, Sedgwick, and other geologists had not yet appeared, the classification of the strata which it contains, is the one still in use. Forster rendered valuable services to the sciences of mining and geology, and for that service, if for no other reason, his name will be remembered for a long time to come. The letters and extracts quoted in this memoir show how upright and honorable he was in his dealings.

Notes

English geologists
English mineralogists
1835 deaths
1772 births